Reese Wilson "Diggsy" Diggs (September 22, 1915 – October 30, 1978) was a Major League Baseball pitcher who played in four games for the Washington Senators in .

External links

1915 births
1978 deaths
Major League Baseball pitchers
Baseball players from Virginia
Washington Senators (1901–1960) players
People from Mathews, Virginia